NASA International Space Apps Challenge is annual NASA's global hackathon, first held in April 2012, and serves as innovation incubation and civic engagement program. NASA and its partners put out challenges relating to current work for which space enthusiasts around the world of all backgrounds can develop innovative solutions (which can be more than just apps!), particularly focusing on use of NASA data and promoting education. The project, formerly run by NASA's Office of the Chief Information Officer, is part of NASA's Earth Science Mission Directorate and is a part of the Open Government Initiative founded under President Barack Obama "creating an unprecedented level of openness in Government." It also fulfills the United States’ commitments to the Open Government Partnership.

NASA Space Apps Goals
Exemplifies principles of transparency, participation and collaboration 
Utilizes openly available data, supplied through NASA missions and technology
Utilizes the talent and skill of passionate volunteers from around the planet
Advances space exploration and improve the quality of life on Earth

How the Event Works
Participants from all backgrounds are welcome.

NASA coordinates the global event, but all locations are independently organized. With the exception of Kennedy Space Center in 2013-2014 and Glenn Research Center in 2015, all locations were organized by entities outside of NASA. However, some locations have been organized by the State Department.

Locations start signing up in the fall prior to the event. Registration by participants and publication of the challenges occur in the early to mid-March time frame.

Common Agenda
Registration & Logistics Briefing/Welcome
Speed Networking Session
Form challenge teams & start work
Progress Briefings
Presentations to the Judges
Awards Ceremony

Despite the name, solutions to challenges could have many forms. Some examples are
Visualizations/simulations of space/scientific principals or data
Interactive Maps
Tools that utilize NASA data sets
Software tools to transmit data for specific tasks
Payload designs for launching
Open-source libraries/tools
Tools utilizing social media and/or mobile devices for scientific/public good
Apps that give information based on user's location or connect the user with other users while illustrating a space/science principal
Games that inform about space/science
Designs for potential future missions (i.e. orbits, landing sites, robots)
Modeling solutions using NASA data sets
Patterns identified in NASA data sets
Ideas to make living in space better/easier
Ideas for connecting the public with what is going on in space/science
Anything the solvers can think of!	

Each location nominates two teams for global judging and one additional team for global People's Choice. Teams are also selected from the virtual projects to go on to global judging. To be eligible for global judging, teams must create a short video explaining their project (length varies across the years).

Years

2012

Over 2,000 people in 25 locations on all seven continents, in space, and virtually participated.

2013

World's Largest Hackathon! 2013: 9,000+ people participants at locations in 44 countries in 83 cities and virtually from anywhere in the world
83 consecutive hours of hacking
57 challenges (25 from NASA)

NASA Administrator Charlie Bolden visited the Kennedy Space Center site.

2014
Main Stage in New York City

45 Challenges focus on 5 mission areas: 
Asteroids
Earth Watch
Human Spaceflight
Robotics
Space Technology

Data & Education were cross-cutting for all mission areas. Additionally, 27 projects from 2013 could also be built upon.

2015
The Main Stage was in New York City. Some countries, due to religious holidays April 11–12, held the challenge April 4–5. Nigeria, due to the potential for turmoil following elections, will hold the challenge April 18–19. All other locations will hold the challenge during the weekend of April 11–12.

Challenge Areas: Earth, Outer Space, Humans and Robotics. Space Technology & Education were cross-cutting for all mission areas.

2016 
Main Stage in Pasadena, California. Women in Data bootcamps held on April 22 in Pasadena. Other cities held bootcamps on other dates leading up to hackathon weekend. Hackathon weekend held April 23–24.

25 Challenges focus on 6 themes: 
International Space Station
Journey to Mars
Earth
Technology
Solar System and Beyond
Aeronautics

2017 
Mainstage East in New York City and Mainstage West in Silicon Valley broadcast their Data Bootcamp Pre-Events. Data Boot Camps were held on April 28 at both main stages. Hackathon weekend was held April 29–30. Overall, this weekend's event included more than 25,000 participants worldwide in nearly 200 cities. The event reached more than 40 million people on social media with #SpaceApps.

The hackathon weekend included 25 Challenges focusing on 5 Earth themes: 
Ideate and Create!
Our Ecological Neighborhood
Warning! Danger Ahead!
Planetary Blues
The Earth and Us

Special Covid-19 Edition 
A Special Covid-19 edition 48-hour hackathon was held on May 30–31, 2020, in which more than 15,000 participants, from over 150 countries created solutions for challenges under six categories.

2020 
The NASA International Space Apps Challenge 2020 (a 48-hour global hackathon) was held on October 2–4, in which more than 26,000 participants, from over 150 countries created more than 2,300 solutions for challenges under six categories.

Women in Data Boot Camps
April 10, 2015

The event was in New York City and was live streamed over the Internet that day. Presenters talked about hackathons, problem solving, communication and storytelling, using NASA data sets, and more. There was a workshop element in the afternoon, for hardware and programming. Virtual participants sent in questions via social media at #AskBootcamp. Focus was on Women in Data.

NASA also updated its Data Portal just prior to the 2015 Space Apps Challenge.

April 22, 2016

The Data Bootcamp model is being adopted by cities around the world—over 40 cities such as Cairo, Kivograd, Guatemala, Sydney, Tirana hosted Women in Data Bootcamps this year. As the mainstage, the city of Pasadena hosted a Women in Data Bootcamp on April 22 to provide women and girls a top-level introduction to coding, data science, technology platforms, and hackathon challenge development. Attendees heard from keynote speakers and panelists including Kimberly Bryant of Black Girls Code, Dr. Anita Sengupta of NASA's Jet Propulsion Laboratory and Astronaut Doug Wheelock.

Space Apps Project Accelerator Toolkit 
In 2015, NASA released the Space Apps Project Accelerator Toolkit to the Space Apps community. The toolkit offers a resource to local Space Apps organizers to build their own community-sourced incubator to accelerate the most promising projects into sustainable innovations. The Toolkit was designed to help innovation take root in communities around the planet, planted from the seeds of NASA's open data.

2021 
The 2021 International Space Apps Challenge marked the tenth annual event for the program with the theme, "The Power of Ten." To celebrate the occasion, organizers brought together ten space agency partners to support the event and added four new award categories for a total of ten award categories for 2021: Best Storytelling, Global Connection, Art & Technology, Local Impact.

Global Winners
The categories vary between the first year (2012) and following years. The winners are judged based on short videos they produce about their project. The videos have been due 5–14 days after the challenge and were limited in length to be 30–120 seconds (varies year to year).

Winners Invited to Launch Viewing Opportunities 
In 2013, Mars Exploration Program offered the Space Apps Global Winners opportunity to attend launch of MAVEN, a Mars Orbiter. Kennedy Space Center also provided winners of their challenges that opportunity. The launch occurred on November 18, 2013 on an Atlas V 401 from Cape Canaveral Air Force Station.

In 2014, Global and Kennedy Space Center winners attended the Orion Exploration Flight Test 1 launch. The launch scrubbed once on December 4 before occurring on December 5, 2014 on a Delta IV Heavy from Cape Canaveral Air Force Station. The launch s.

In 2015, Global and the overall Kennedy Space Center winners attended the viewing opportunity for the Cygnus CRS OA-4 launch, taking cargo and experiments to the International Space Station. The launch scrubbed twice on December 3 and 4; it occurred on December 6, 2015 on an Atlas V 401 from Cape Canaveral Air Force Station.

In 2016, Global and the overall Kennedy Space Center winners were invited to attend the launch of OSIRIS-Rex, visiting the asteroid Bennu. The launch occurred on September 8, 2016 on an Atlas V 411 from Cape Canaveral Air Force Station.

In 2017, Global winners were invited to attend the launch of TDRS-M, a NASA Tracking and Data Relay Satellite operated by the Space Communications and Navigation Program (SCaN). The mission experienced delays in weeks leading up to launch on August 18, 2017 on an Atlas V 401 from Cape Canaveral Air Force Station.

Social media
As Space Apps is a global event, there is a very active social media element to the event. Participants can form teams virtually, collaborating even if they aren't sharing a physical space and never meet face to face. #SpaceApps is used on Twitter and many other platforms. Each challenge is also assigned its own hashtag Sharing of live streaming at the events has been organized some years. Hackpads for the challenges allow participants to ask questions of the experts and also coordinate virtual collaboration. Google Hangouts have also been coordinated with astronauts on the International Space Station and as a method of subject matter experts sharing expertise with participants.

Yuri's Night
In 2014–2015, Space Apps planned the weekend to occur over Yuri's Night, April 12, when people around the world have parties and events to celebrate achievements in human spaceflight.

Global Collaborators

Current
NASA
SecondMuse
Booz Allen Hamilton
Mindgrub

Past (Government)
JAXA
United States Department of State
National Science Foundation
US Embassy in Jakarta
Australian Space Policy Unit
Technology Strategy Board
British Atmospheric Data Centre
White House Office of Science and Technology Policy
European Space Agency
Environmental Protection Agency

Past (Outside of Government)
Geeks Without Bounds
Ustream
GitHub
Urban Engine
Random Hacks of Kindness
Yahoo! Developer Network
Gov 2.0 Radio
Innovation Endeavours
Talenthouse
National Oceanic and Atmospheric Administration
MetOffice UK

Cultural References
As a part of promotion of The Martian (film), the Ares 3: Farewell video was released on the Ares: live YouTube channel. The following crew fact was presented at 1:22 in the video for Beth Johanssen (a computer scientist played by Kate Mara) : "Won NASA's largest hackathon when she was seventeen." As Space Apps currently is NASA's global hackathon and was the world's (not just NASA's) largest in 2013, this alludes to Beth having won Space Apps.

References

Hackathons
NASA programs